The School of International and Public Affairs (SIPA) is the international affairs and public policy school of Columbia University, a private Ivy League university located in Morningside Heights, Manhattan, New York City. It is consistently ranked the top graduate school for international relations in the world. 

SIPA offers Master of International Affairs (MIA) and Master of Public Administration (MPA) degrees in a range of fields, as well as the Executive MPA and Ph.D. program in Sustainable Development.

SIPA's alumni include former heads of state, business leaders, journalists, diplomats, and elected representatives. Half of SIPA's nearly 1,400 students are international, coming from over 100 countries. SIPA has more than 70 full-time faculty, many of which include the world's leading scholars on international relations.

History 

Columbia University's School of International Affairs was founded in 1946 following the aftermath of World War II. Emphasizing practical training, the mission of SIPA was to foster the understanding of critical regions and to prepare diplomats, officials, and other professionals to meet the complexities of the postwar world. It originated in dynamic regional institutes that drew on Columbia's renowned faculties in history, economics, political science, linguistics, and other traditional fields. The School initially awarded a Master of International Affairs (MIA) degree.

By 1967, the School was home to eight regional institutes, covering nearly every part of the globe. It also contained the non-area-specific Institute of War and Peace Studies (now the Arnold A. Saltzman Institute of War and Peace Studies), founded in 1951 by university president Dwight D. Eisenhower. Originally housed in a row of brownstones, the School moved into its own 15-story building in 1971.

To meet a growing demand for public service professionals, the school added a second degree, the Master of Public Administration, in 1977. In 1981, the program was renamed the Graduate Program in Public Policy and Administration and the school renamed the School of International and Public Affairs.

In the early 1990s, SIPA began appointing its own faculty, supplementing the distinguished social and natural scientists and humanists with whom SIPA students studied around the university. Within 15 years, SIPA faculty were among the most prominent in their fields, including the one-time director of the U.S. census, a Nobel Laureate in Economics, a judge on the appellate body of the World Trade Organization, economic advisors in both the Bill Clinton and George H. W. Bush administrations, a former assistant secretary general of the United Nations, and many distinguished research scholars.

In 1992, with support from the World Bank, the Program in Economic Policy Management (PEPM) was established to provide mid-career finance professionals with the skills required for the effective design and implementation of economic policy, emphasizing the problems of developing and transition economies. Students who complete PEPM's requirements are awarded an MPA degree.

To accommodate the needs of working professionals who could not pursue full-time study, SIPA established the Executive MPA program in 1999 as part of the Picker Center for Executive Education. In 2001 the School introduced an MPA in Environmental Science and Policy (ESP), which condenses the two years into twelve consecutive months, without a reduction in requirements, and provides core courses in management and policy analysis with a concentration in environmental science and earth systems. The ESP MPA program is offered in cooperation with The Earth Institute and the Lamont–Doherty Earth Observatory. In fall 2004 SIPA inaugurated its first doctoral program, the interdisciplinary Ph.D. in Sustainable Development, which combines elements of a traditional graduate education in social science, particularly economics, with a significant training in the natural sciences.

On March 23, 2022 current professor and director of the  Saltzman Institute, Keren Yarhi-Milo was named Dean.

Academics

International dual-degree programs 
SIPA offers a number of dual-degree programs with other schools of Columbia University and offers international dual degree programs with the London School of Economics and Political Science, Sciences Po, the Hertie School of Governance in Berlin, EAESP-FGV in São Paulo, the University of Tokyo and the Lee Kuan Yew School of Public Policy at the National University of Singapore through the Global Public Policy Network (GPPN).

Concentrations and specializations 

In addition to fulfilling all core requirements, MIA and MPA students must also satisfy the requirements of both a policy concentration and a specialization. Students choose one of the following six concentrations: Economic and Political Development; Energy and Environment; International Finance and Economic Policy (includes focus areas in international finance; international economic policy; and central banking); Human Rights and Humanitarian Policy; International Security Policy; or Urban and Social Policy.

Students choose a specialization in one of the following: Data Analytics and Quantitative Analysis; Gender and Public Policy; International Conflict Resolution; International Organization and UN Studies; Technology, Media, and Communications; Management; or regional expertise (8 different regions/countries). Regional specializations are offered in the following areas: Africa, East Asia, East Central Europe, Europe, Latin America, The Middle East, Russia, South Asia, and the United States. The Advanced Policy and Economic Analysis (APEA) specialization was discontinued during the 2018–2019 academic year.

Rankings  and reputation 
US News and World Report ranked SIPA first in Global Policy and Administration Programs. Foreign Policy ranked SIPA fifth in its 2018 ranking of "Top Master's Programs for Policy Career in International Relations". In addition, SIPA was ranked first by U.S. News & World Report Best Graduates Schools in the 2018, 2020, 2021, and 2022 world rankings for International Global Policy and Administration and fifth for Environmental Policy and Management.

Centers 

SIPA is home to five centers:

 Center for Development Economics and Policy (CDEP): Supports microeconomic research to investigate the sources of poverty and to inform practical interventions to address them.
Center on Global Energy Policy (CGEP): Provides independent, balanced, data-driven analysis to help policymakers navigate the complex world of energy.
 Center on Global Economic Governance (CGEG): Produces policy-oriented research on global economic governance.
 Center for International Conflict Resolution (CICR): Contributes to the resolution of international deadly conflict through research, education and practice. It was founded in 1997 by professor Andrea Bartoli as the International Conflict Resolution Program. The center was renamed in 2002, and it is a research center located within the Saltzman Institute of War and Peace Studies. 
 Saltzman Institute of War and Peace Studies (SIWPS): Founded in 1951 under the sponsorship of Dwight D. Eisenhower, during his tenure as president of Columbia University, SIWPS was created to promote understanding of the "disastrous consequences of war upon man's spiritual, intellectual, and material progress". The institute has become one of the leading research centers on international relations in the United States.

Publications

Journal of International Affairs was established in 1947 and is the oldest university-affiliated publication in the field of international relations; it is edited by SIPA students.

The Morningside Post is SIPA's student-founded, student-run multimedia news publication. Its content: student-written investigative news about SIPA and the SIPA community, plus world affairs analysis, opinion, and satire.

Conflict Resolution Journal is a dynamic and evolving web-based project founded by SIPA students.

SIPA News is a biannual publication featuring articles by faculty, students, and alumni as well as news about the school.

Notable alumni
Alice P. Albright, CEO of the Millennium Challenge Corporation
Madeleine Albright, former United States Secretary of State
Joseph Kofi Adda, Member of Ghanaian Parliament for Navrongo Central and Ghanaian Minister for Energy
Ibrahim Agboola Gambari, Minister of External Affairs of Nigeria and UN Under-Secretary-General for Political Affairs
Karen Attiah, Global Opinions editor for The Washington Post
Jose Ramos Horta (graduate student), President of East Timor (2007–); former prime minister; Nobel Laureate
David Kay, Chief UN weapons inspector and head of Iraq Survey Group
George Tenet, Former Director of the Central Intelligence Agency
Robert L. Belknap, scholar of Fyodor Dostoevsky, former director of the Harriman Institute, acting dean of Columbia College
Howard Warren Buffett, former policy advisor (for Barack Obama), executive director of the Howard G. Buffett Foundation
Wang Boming, editor-in-chief of China's Caijing magazine
William Clark Jr., former U.S. Ambassador to India
 Hagar Chemali, Political Satirist, Writer, Producer, Television Personality, and Political Commentator
 Fotini Christia, Ford International Professor of the Social Sciences at Massachusetts Institute of Technology
Julie J. Chung, US Diplomat
Bill de Blasio, former Mayor of New York City and former Public Advocate 
Monica Crowley, Assistant Secretary of Public Affairs at US Department of Treasury
Ina Drew, former Chief Investment Officer for J.P. Morgan; forced to resign after JPM suffered a trading loss of $2 billion in April/May 2012
 Pamela Druckerman, writer and freelance journalist
Daniel Fried, Assistant U.S. Secretary of State for European and Eurasian Affairs
Steven Fulop, Mayor of Jersey City, New Jersey
Eric Garcetti, Mayor of Los Angeles
Nellie Gorbea, Secretary of State of Rhode Island
Victor Gotbaum, Head of DC37, the largest municipal union in New York City
Patricia M. Haslach, former U.S. Ambassador to Laos
Jingdong Hua, Treasurer and Vice President of the International Finance Corporation
Joe Hurd, Global Managing Director of SOSV and former Commerce Department political appointee in the Obama Administration
Sara Jacobs, U.S. Congresswoman for California's 53rd congressional district
Deborah Lee James, 23rd United States Secretary of the Air Force
Letitia James, New York Attorney General former Public Advocate
Karine Jean-Pierre, White House Press Secretary
Roula Khalaf, editor-in-chief, Financial Times
Glenn Kessler (journalist), Washington Post reporter and author
Leo KoGuan, Chinese American billionaire, founder of SHI International Corp, third largest shareholder in Tesla, Inc.
Shinjirō Koizumi, son of former Japanese Prime Minister Junichiro Koizumi; secretary of the Japanese National Diet 
Stephen Krasner, Director for Policy Planning at the U.S. Department of State and Professor of International Relations at Stanford University
Edward Luck, United Nations expert and SIPA professor
Gunnar Lund, Ambassador of Sweden to France (2008–present); formerly to the United States
Lorie K. Logan, 14th President and CEO of the Federal Reserve Bank of Dallas
Nancy McEldowney, National Security Advisor to Vice President elect Kamala Harris & former Director of the Foreign Service Institute
Mark A. Milley, 39th Chief of Staff of the United States Army and 20th Chairman of the Joint Chiefs of Staff  
Jim Nicholson, former U.S. Secretary of Veterans Affairs
Michael Oren, Israeli ambassador to the United States
David Pekoske, Administrator of the Transportation Security Administration
Michael Pettis, American economist, professor at Guanghua School of Management
Robert D. Reischauer, Director of the U.S. Congressional Budget Office
Curtis Roosevelt, international civil servant and professor
James Rubin, Assistant Secretary of State for Public Affairs and Chief Spokesman for the State Department (August 1997–April 2000)
Vuslat Doğan Sabancı, billionaire Turkish businesswoman and chairwoman of Hürriyet
Salim Ahmed Salim, Prime Minister of Tanzania, Secretary General of the Organization of African Unity, President of the United Nations General Assembly
Elissa Slotkin, former U.S. Assistant Secretary of Defense for International Security Affairs and Congresswoman for Michigan's 8th Congressional District
William E. Schaufele Jr., former U.S. representative, UN Security Council; former Ambassador to Poland
Andrew J. Shapiro Assistant Secretary of State for Political-Military Affairs (2009–2013)
Claire Shipman, ABC News correspondent
Sichan Siv, former U.S. Deputy Secretary of State, former U.S. Ambassador to the United Nations Economic and Social Council (ECOSOC)
Richard Mills Smith, CEO of Newsweek
Frank Snepp, journalist and former CIA analyst
Joan E. Spero, President of the Doris Duke Charitable Foundation and Undersecretary of State for Economic, Business, and Agricultural Affairs
Katie Stanton, head of international strategy, Twitter
Puneet Talwar, Assistant Secretary of State for Political-Military Affairs and United States Ambassador to Morocco nominee
Tian Huiyu, CEO of China Merchants Bank
Jens Ulltveit-Moe, Founder and CEO of Umoe AS
Alexander Vershbow, Deputy Secretary General of NATO and former Assistant Secretary of Defense for International Security Affairs
Ross Wilson, U.S. Ambassador to Turkey
Brian Wynter, Governor of the Bank of Jamaica
Donald Yamamoto, Principal Deputy Assistant Secretary of State and former ambassador to Ethiopia
Peter Zalmayev, human rights activist and Director of the Eurasia Democracy Initiative

Notable current faculty
Rohit Aggarwala, commissioner of the New York City Department of Environmental Protection
Sultan Sooud Al-Qassemi, Emirati educator and columnist
Séverine Autesserre, expert on peacebuilding and peacekeeping
Scott Barrett, professor of natural resource economics
John Battelle, media entrepreneur, co-founding editor of Wired
Chris Blattman, development economist, blogger
Jagdish Bhagwati, trade economist
Richard K. Betts, prominent political scientist and former director of the Saltzman Institute of War and Peace Studies
J. Bowyer Bell, historian, artist, and art critic
Stephen Biddle, author, historian, policy analyst
Akeel Bilgrami, philosopher of language and of mind
Sandra Black, economist, former member of the Council of Economic Advisers
Jason Bordoff, founding dean of Columbia Climate School
Ian Bremmer, founder of Eurasia Group
Howard Warren Buffett, research scholar, grandson of Warren Buffett
Charles Calomiris, financial policy expert
Guillermo Calvo, economist for macroeconomics and monetary economics, famous for Calvo (staggered) contracts
Mauricio Cárdenas Santamaría, 69th Minister of Finance and Public Credit and former Minister of Mines and Energy of Colombia
Thomas J. Christensen, China expert
Richard Clarida, former Vice Chair of the Federal Reserve
Hillary Rodham Clinton, former United States Secretary of State and former First Lady of the United States
John Henry Coatsworth, former provost of Columbia University, Latin American expert
Steven A. Cohen, former director of The Earth Institute
Mamadou Diouf, historian
Michael W. Doyle, the theorist of the liberal “democratic peace” 
Albert Fishlow, noted expert on Brazil and former Deputy Assistant Secretary of State for Inter-American Affairs
Howard Steven Friedman, Health Economist and Statistician at the United Nations
Ester Fuchs, urban and social policy expert
Geoffrey M. Heal, British-American economist known for contributions to environmental economics
Christopher R. Hill, former United States Ambassador to Iraq and dean of the Josef Korbel School of International Studies
Merit Janow, the only North American member of the WTO appellate body; former Deputy Assistant U.S. Trade Representative for Japan and China (1990–1993)
Robert Jervis, one of the most influential international relations scholars, expert on foreign policy analysis and political psychology
Rashid Khalidi, historian and former director of SIPA's Middle East Institute
Kenneth Lipper, former deputy mayor of New York City, financier, novelist, and screenwriter
John Liu, former New York City Comptroller and current member of the New York State Senate
Mark M. Lowenthal, former Assistant Director of Central Intelligence for Analysis and Production and Deputy Assistant Secretary of State for Intelligence Research
Edward Luck, expert on the United Nations
William H. Luers, retired career diplomat and museum executive
Mahmood Mamdani, leading Africa scholar
Jack F. Matlock Jr., former U.S. Ambassador to the Soviet Union
Keren Yarhi-Milo, political scientist and director of the Arnold A. Saltzman Institute of War and Peace Studies
Michael Nutter, 98th Mayor of Philadelphia
Michael E. O'Hanlon, defense researcher at The Brookings Institution 
José Antonio Ocampo, former UN Under-Secretary-General for Economic and Social Affairs
Mary Robinson, the first female President of the Republic of Ireland; United Nations High Commissioner for Human Rights
Arvind Panagariya, professor of economics
Kenneth Prewitt, political scientist and former director of the United States Census Bureau
David Rothkopf, chairman and CEO of The Rothkopf Group, and Garten Rothkopf, and former Deputy Undersecretary of Commerce for International Trade
Jeffrey Sachs, chief economic advisor to many governments, former Director of the UN Millennium Project, Special Advisor to United Nations Secretary-General on the Millennium Development Goals
Giovanni Sartori, Albert Schweitzer Professor Emeritus in the Humanities at Columbia University
Stephen Sestanovich, former Ambassador-at-large and Special Advisor to the Secretary of State on the New Independent States (NIS)
Gary Sick, Iran expert and three-time member of the National Security Council
 David Siegel - Adjunct Professor of Entrepreneurial, Organizational and Strategic Management ; CEO of Investopedia
David C. Stark, professor of sociology
Alfred Stepan,  professor of government
Joseph Stiglitz, Nobel Prize-winning former Senior Vice President and Chief Economist of the World Bank and former chair of the President's Council of Economic Advisors
Kenneth Waltz, one of the most influential international relations scholars.  He is one of the founders of neorealism, or structural realism, in international relations theory.

Notable former faculty
Lisa Anderson, former dean of SIPA and a leading expert on the Middle East; former president of the American University in Cairo
Zbigniew Brzezinski, National Security Advisor under U.S. President Jimmy Carter
David Dinkins, first African American mayor of New York City
Ernst Jaeckh (1875–1959), German-born orientalist and founder of the Middle East Institute
Robert C. Lieberman, former interim dean of SIPA and provost of the Johns Hopkins University
John Ruggie, former dean of SIPA; former Assistant Secretary-General and chief advisor for strategic planning to United Nations Secretary-General Kofi Annan. He continues to serve as the UN Secretary General's Special Representative for Business and Human Rights
Zalmay Khalilzad, former United States Ambassador to the United Nations
Amina J. Mohammed, Deputy-Secretary-General of the United Nations and former Ministry of Environment of Nigeria

Notable former international fellows
Michael Armacost, diplomat, Deputy Secretary of State, president of Brookings Institution
Bonnie Erbe, host of the PBS television show To the Contrary
Harold Varmus, Nobel Prize winner, head of National Institute of Health
Jim Hightower, progressive activist
Richard M. Smith, chairman and editor-in-chief of Newsweek
Frederick Kempe, president, Atlantic Council of the United States

References

External links
 Columbia University School of International and Public Affairs
 Master of Public Administration in Environmental Science and Policy
 Journal of International Affairs
 Conflict Resolution Journal
 The Harriman Institute
 The Morningside Post
 SIPA News
 Global Public Policy Network
 International Fellows Program

Columbia University
Public administration schools in the United States
Schools of international relations in the United States
Educational institutions established in 1946
Public policy schools
1946 establishments in New York City